Eques, horseman or rider in Latin, may refer to: 

 Equites, a member of the Roman Equestrian order
 the Latin word for a knight in chess